DeMarco Sampson, Jr. (born December 19, 1985) is a former American football wide receiver. He played college football at San Diego State University and high school football at Castle Park High School in Chula Vista, California. He is now a high school football coach at Montgomery High School in San Diego, CA

College career

Sampson was one of only two freshmen to earn a letter in 2005. He appeared in all 12 games recording 6 receptions for 60 yards and a touchdown.

He did not play at all in the 2006 season due to injury.

He missed his second straight year in 2007 due to an injury.

He saw action in 11 games as a reserve in 2008. He caught 11 passes for 111 yards and 1 touchdown.

Sampson re-earned his starting job in 2009. He accumulated 62 receptions for 851 yards and 8 touchdowns. His performance earned him second-team all MWC conference honors.

Sampson returned to school for his sixth year of eligibility in 2010. He had a career year by catching 67 passes for 1,220 yards and 8 touchdowns. His outstanding numbers earned him a spot on the 2010 All-Mountain West First-team as voted by the coaches.

Professional career

Arizona Cardinals
Sampson was drafted with the 249th overall pick in the 2011 NFL Draft by the Arizona Cardinals.

Buffalo Bills
Sampson signed with the Buffalo Bills on May 30, 2013. On August 26, 2013, he was cut by the Bills.

Los Angeles Kiss
Sampson was assigned to the Los Angeles Kiss of the Arena Football League on January 2, 2014. He was activated from the "other league exempt" list on May 13, 2014.

San Francisco 49ers
Sampson was signed by the San Francisco 49ers on January 14, 2014. Sampson was waived on May 12, 2014

Personal life

Sampson was born in Oakland, California to Karen and DeMarco Sampson. His mother's cousin is former Bengals running back, Icky Woods.

References

External links
San Diego State Aztecs bio
NFL.com bio
Arena Football bio

1985 births
Living people
Sportspeople from Chula Vista, California
Players of American football from California
San Diego State Aztecs football players
American football wide receivers
Arizona Cardinals players
Buffalo Bills players
Los Angeles Kiss players
San Francisco 49ers players